Pearman's Copse is a   Local Nature Reserve in Lower Earley, a suburb of Reading in Berkshire. It is owned and managed by Wokingham District Council.

Geography and site

The nature reserve is ancient woodland which features coppiced areas. The reserve is surrounded by community woodland and it links with Dinton Pastures Country Park.

History

In 2005 the site was declared as a local nature reserve by Wokingham Borough Council.

Fauna 
The site has the following fauna:

Invertebrates 

 Lasius Flavus
 Lasius Niger
 Gammarus
 Asellus aquaticus
 Armadillidium vulgare
 Armadillidium nasatum
 Porcellio Scaber

Mammals 

 Red fox
 Eastern Grey squirrel
 Wood mouse

Birds 

 Wood pigeon
 Collared dove
 Robin
 Jay

Flora 
The site has the following flora:

Trees
Acer campestre
Corylus avellana
Fraxinus excelsior
Quercus robur

References

Parks and open spaces in Berkshire
Nature reserves in Berkshire
Local Nature Reserves in Berkshire